Nelly Mukazayire, is a Rwandan economist and public administrator, who serves as the chief executive officer of the Rwanda Convention Bureau, a division of the Rwanda Development Board.

Before that, she served as the deputy chief of staff, in the office of the president of Rwanda. And prior to that, she was a senior adviser to the chief of staff in the office of the president. Before she came to the president's office, she served as a policy researcher in the economics department in the
prime minister's office.

Early life and education
Nelly Mukazayire was born to Rwandese parents in Rwanda circa 1982. She attended local schools for her primary and secondary education. She studied at the  earning a Bachelor of Science degree in International Economics.

She also holds a Master of Arts degree in Economic Policy Management. One credible source states the master's degree was obtained from Makerere University, in neighboring Uganda. Another trusted source states that the master's degree was awarded by a university in the United States.

Career
For most of her career, Ms Mukazayire has worked as a high-ranking official in the Paul Kagame-led, post-Rwanda Genocide government. In an October 2018 cabinet reshuffle, she was named as the CEO of Rwanda Convention Bureau, a government department. In her current position, she is at the rank of a Minister of State and reports directly to Clare Akamanzi, the executive director and CEO of Rwanda Development Board, a cabinet-level position.

Her unit is responsible for implementing the policy of developing and expanding the "Meetings, Incentives, Conferences and Exhibitions" (MICE) policy of the Rwandan government. That section of the tourism sector was responsible for 15 percent of tourism revenue, amounting to US$42 million in 2017, and projected to grow to US$74 million in 2018.

Family
Nelly Mukazayire is married.

Other considerations
Ms Mukazayire was 12 years old in 1994 when the Rwanda Genocide took place. Nelly's mother was convicted to a lifetime prison sentence for being a participant in the genocide, by a Gacaca court. In testimonies on multiple occasions, Nelly uses her personal experience to demonstrate how the current Rwandan government does not transfer blame to the offspring and other family members of the genocide perpetrators. They too enjoy benefits available to all Rwandan citizens.

See also
Cabinet of Rwanda

Photos and diagrams
Photo of Nelly Mukazayire at Newtimes.co.rw

References

External links
 Website of the Rwanda Convention Bureau

1982 births
Living people
Rwandan women
Rwandan economists
University of Rwanda alumni
Makerere University alumni
21st-century Rwandan women
21st-century economists
Women economists